March Route of Rochambeau's Army: Ridgebury Road is a historic site in Ridgefield, Connecticut.  It was listed on the National Register of Historic Places in 2003.

It is along the march route taken by French commander Rochambeau's troops in 1781.

It's a 1600-foot section of the Ridgebury Road, and the defined property is about 50 feet wide, running from stone walls on either side.  It is known with certainty to have been traversed by Rochambeau's army in 1781, and the current appearance in this section is much the same now as it was then.

It's one of multiple properties whose possible listing on the National Register was covered in a 2001 study.

See also
March Route of Rochambeau's army
List of historic sites preserved along Rochambeau's route

References

Roads on the National Register of Historic Places in Connecticut
Historic districts in Fairfield County, Connecticut
Connecticut in the American Revolution
Ridgefield, Connecticut
Historic places on the Washington–Rochambeau Revolutionary Route
American Revolution on the National Register of Historic Places
National Register of Historic Places in Fairfield County, Connecticut